Antonio Elías Julião (11 April 1929 – 15 May 1973), known as just Julião, was a Brazilian footballer. He played in one match for the Brazil national football team in 1956. He was also part of Brazil's squad for the 1956 South American Championship.

References

External links
 

1929 births
1973 deaths
Brazilian footballers
Brazil international footballers
Place of birth missing
Association footballers not categorized by position